The Last Sharknado: It's About Time is a 2018 American made-for-television science fiction comedy disaster film and the sixth and final installment in the Sharknado film series. The film was directed by Anthony C. Ferrante with Ian Ziering, Tara Reid and Cassie Scerbo reprising their roles from the previous installments. In the film, Fin and the gang use time travel in order to stop sharknados from ever happening in history. The film received generally negative reviews.

Plot 

Immediately following the events of the previous film, with the Earth completely devastated from the global sharknado swarm, Fin and his now-adult son Gil travel back 66 million years to the Cretaceous in order to prevent the first sharknado and destroy the phenomenon once and for all. Shortly after arriving, Gil vanishes; Fin learns from a message recorded by Gil earlier that due to the instability of the energy needed to time travel, any individual person can only travel back in time once, with any subsequent trips resulting in their disappearance. Fin retrieves the bag containing April's cybernetic head from a dinosaur with aid from Nova, and they are joined by pre-cyborg April and Bryan, all three of whom were saved by Gil removing them from the times of their original deaths. As they begin to lay out their plan, the very first sharknado appears in conjunction with a meteor shower. Fin then plans to use the meteorites' heat to blow up the sharknado. The gang then approaches the sharknado on a pterodactylus and Fin jumps down onto a shark and tries to navigate it to consume meteorite fragments. As they execute the plan, they see the past version of Gil riding a dinosaur inside the sharknado before he disappears into the future. Eventually, Fin knocks the shark into the sharknado before it explodes and dissipates the storm. Believing they have changed history to erase the sharknado phenomenon, the group use a capacitor built into Gil's flight insignia to try to travel back to the present day.

However, Fin and company instead arrive in medieval Camelot, with Bryan turned into a woman due to a temporal alteration. They encounter Morgana le Fay and are brought before Merlin, discovering Gil's research on the Einstein-Rosen bridge to create a method of time travel. Furthermore, Gil's time traveling has altered space-time, unleashing the sharknados throughout history as he searches for his parents. April also learns of her future when Fin accidentally drops the bag with Robot April's head and the others discover its contents, apologizing for keeping April in the dark to spare her from knowing her fate. She accepts Fin’s apology, but just as they reconnect, another sharknado forms and heads straight to the castle. The Gil of the past uses the sharknado to travel into the future, and Fin decides to use Excalibur to defeat the sharknado, with Morgana killed by one of the sharks. The group then travel to the Revolutionary War where they meet Benjamin Franklin and George Washington, with Bryan (who returned to original form) convincing them to let them use their cannons to destroy the sharknado that threatens the Revolutionary Army's fleet. They succeed, with Bryan remaining behind as the others continue.

Ending up in the Wild West, the group unwittingly allows Billy the Kid to escape capture when they arrive, resulting in Fin's arrest by the local sheriff while April and Nova hide. However, as Billy was Gil's escape route to the next sharknado, this threatens to severely alter the timeline. Nova and April are rescued by Skye, who was also saved by Gil before being sent back to the Wild West. Skye helps April and Nova save Fin and Gil, with Skye establishing a bootstrap paradox by telling Gil to save her future self. Realizing that they can do nothing that would interfere with Gil's journey through time in search of his parents, the group allow him to make a time leap using the sharknado before destroying it with Robot April's eye lasers. The group then use a train to create the next time portal, ending up at a beach in the 1950s as a sharknado is forming. Fin encounters younger versions of his parents Gilbert and Raye, who have been enlisted by Gil to help create the time capacitor. After Gil makes his time leap by entering the sharknado on a surfboard, the group nullifies it using a ray gun created by him and his grandparents. The group tries to follow Gil to July 11, 2013 to stop the sharknado from the first film, but Nova sabotages the capacitor to travel to 1997 instead, where she attempts to save her grandfather from being killed in the shark attack that traumatized her as a child. Despite Fin's warnings against altering her personal timeline to such a degree, Nova rescues her grandfather only to be eaten in the shark attack herself. April is killed as well, while Robot April's head is lost in the ocean.

Devastated, Fin and Skye decide to continue on and use a shark to attempt another jump to 2013. However, they instead end up in the far future of the year 20013, where they find that Robot April has taken over the ruined world left by the global sharknado using an army of her clones and flying, robotic sharks. She explains that after her head was found by a fishing boat, she felt abandoned and spent the next 20,000 years developing a stable time machine, which she used to force Fin into her future so they could be together forever. Robot April freezes Skye in carbonite and tries to convince Fin to stay with her using her clones of their children and Nova, but Fin refuses, prompting her to torture him with electricity until the human April, who Robot April revived and preserved to act as a genetic base for the clones, wakes up and intervenes. While the two Aprils fight each other, Fin uses the time machine to reach 2013, where he lands on Captain Santiago's boat right as the true first sharknado forms. Fin finds that Santiago's crew has found Robot April's head, and intervenes to change history and prevent her from becoming evil. Fin and Santiago battle the sharks while Robot April's head recharges her eye lasers in order to destroy the sharknado. However, the Robot April of the future (disguised as Gil) arrives, and her struggle with Fin inside the sharknado damages the capacitor, tearing the fabric of reality. Time begins collapsing, creating a "timenado" in which figures from throughout history such as Cleopatra and Adolf Hitler pass through the vortex as it destroys the universe. The present-day Robot April's head helps Fin finally destroy her future self, and he triggers her nuclear reset failsafe, sacrificing themselves in order to destroy the sharknado and stitch time back together, resulting in the creation of a new timeline.

In the new, sharknado-free timeline, all of the Shepard family and friends are alive. Fin and April run the bar from the first film with Nova, who now likes sharks. April is pregnant with Gil. A television commercial reveals that Skye has become a politician and is a leading presidential candidate. Fin's daughter Claudia delivers Fin a letter from his father, who is in space and has sent his flight insignia as a gift for Gil's birth. Fin, who plans to retire to Kansas with April and Gil, delivers an emotional farewell speech to his friends and family. April goes into labor, and everyone rushes out of the bar to head to the hospital. As they leave, the television plays a broadcast of The Today Show with Al Roker reporting that there are no clouds in the sky at all, an occurrence that will likely never happen again.

Cast

Principal cast 
 Ian Ziering as Fin Shepard
 Tara Reid as April Wexler
 Cassie Scerbo as Nova Clarke
 Catarina Scerbo as young Nova
 Judah Friedlander as Bryan
 Debra Wilson as new Bryan
 Vivica A. Fox as Skye

Supporting cast

 Brendan Petrizzo as Hologram Gil
 M. Steven Felty as D. Brown and Voice of Hologram Gil
 Matie Moncea as Gil on Dinosaur
 T-Rex (Todd Rex) as T-Rex Operator
 Neil deGrasse Tyson as Merlin 
 Alaska as Morgana
 Marina Sirtis as Winter
 Audrey Latt and Ana Maria Varty Mihail as Maidens
 Tiberiu Hansan as Medieval Gil
 Andrew Olteanu as Frodo
 Leslie Jordan as Benjamin Franklin  
 Darrell Hammond as George Washington  
 Ben Stein as Alexander Hamilton  
 Roy Taylor as Jebediah Clarke  
 Constantin Viscreanu as Paul Revere  
 Dexter Holland as British Captain  
 Ian Ridenhour, Kathrine Ridenhour and Chris Ridenhour as Townspeople
 Jonathan Bennett as Billy the Kid
 Dee Snider as Sheriff
 Chris Owen as 30-Year-Old Gil
 James Murray as Eastwood
 Kim Little as Cowgirl
 Brady Latt, Moise Latt, Aiden Cano and Zachary Cano as Cowboys
 Gilbert Gottfried as Rand McDonald, Ron McDonald's father
 Tori Spelling as Raye Martin
 Dean McDermott as Gilly Shepard
 Benjy Bronk as Connor Beale
 Robbie Rist as Quint Guitarist
 Anthony C. Ferrante as Quint Singer
 Joel Valder as Quint Drummer
 Thom Bowyer as Quint Bassist
 Raine Michaels as Yellow Polka Dot Bikini Girl
 Bob Ellis as Surfer Gil
 Erin Ziering as Beach Mom
 Mia Ziering and Penna Ziering as Beach Kids
 Ronanna Bina, Kacie Flower, Courtney Quod, Brandon Quod, Nick Grothe, Tammy Klein, Anna Rasmussen and Ana Florit as 1950s Dancers
 Christopher Knight as Grandpa Clarke 
 Bernie Kopell as Charter Boat Captain
 Juliana Ferrante as Juliana
 Emma Neal as Emma
 Israel Sáez de Miguel as Captain Carlos Santiago
 Marcus Choi as Palmer
 Alexandre Ottoni de Menezes (aka Jovem Nerd) as Azzinaro
 La Toya Jackson as Cleopatra
 James Hong as Confucius
 Eileen Davidson as Marie Antoinette
 Shad Gaspard as Muhammad Ali
 Jayson Paul as Joe Louis
 Kato Kaelin as Viking King
 Patrick Labyorteaux as Julius Caesar
 Julia LaJuett as Amelia Earhart
 Paul Logan as Egyptian Guard
 Sharon Desiree as Joan of Arc
 Al Roker as himself
 Petunia as herself
 Thunder Levin as Bar Patron

Guest stars
 Chuck Hittinger as Matt Shepard
 Ryan Newman as Claudia Shepard
 Gary Busey as Wilford Wexler
 Bo Derek as May Wexler
 Mark McGrath as Martin Brody
 Masiela Lusha as Gemini
 John Heard as George (archive footage)

Production
In February 2018, the film was confirmed to be released that summer to follow upon Sharknado 5s premiere, Tara Reid, Ian Ziering and Cassie Scerbo were set to return. On March 28, 2018, Syfy confirmed the film will be the final installment of the series.

On May 25, the film's title, The Last Sharknado: It's About Time was revealed by a teaser trailer.  A 30-second trailer was released on August 2. Vivica A. Fox, who had starred in Sharknado 2, also returned for the final installment.

Several other actors reprised their roles in cameos for the final scene of the movie, including Chuck Hittinger reappearing as Matt Shepard, replacing Cody Linley who had portrayed Matt in the fourth and fifth movies. Archival footage of John Heard, who portrayed George in the original film, was also used in tribute to the actor, who had passed away in July 2017.

Reception
On Metacritic, the film has a score of 22 out of 100 based on reviews from 5 critics, indicating "generally unfavorable reviews". On Rotten Tomatoes it has a score of  based on reviews from  critics.

References

External links

 
 
 
 

2018 films
2018 horror films
2018 television films
2010s comedy horror films
2010s science fiction comedy films
2010s disaster films
2018 independent films
2010s English-language films
2010s science fiction horror films
American comedy horror films
American science fiction comedy films
American disaster films
American independent films
American science fiction horror films
American science fiction television films
American sequel films
Disaster comedy films
Science fiction disaster films
The Asylum films
American comedy television films
Films directed by Anthony C. Ferrante
Films shot in Bucharest
American horror television films
Films about shark attacks
Films about sharks
Sharknado 6
Syfy original films
Television sequel films
Films about time travel
2010s American films